Wilson High School is a secondary school in Wilson, Oklahoma, U.S.A. with 483 students. It serves grades 9 through 12, and includes an alternative high school program.

The current building was built in 1978–79, replacing one built in 1917–18.

They teach History, Music, Math, English, Art, Physical Education. They have a football team called the "Wilson's Stinging Hornets" They play in the football season and have won 24 games and lost 72. Despite the small population of students the school tries hard for them to ensure a normal education.

References

Public high schools in Oklahoma
Schools in Carter County, Oklahoma